The Organization of Defensive Innovation and Research or S.P.N.D. (transliterated Sazman-e Pazhouheshhaye Novin-e Defa’i and abbreviated سازمان سپند) is a research and development agency of the Iran's Ministry of Defence responsible for the development of emerging technologies for use by the military. According to Iranian medias, it is the Iranian counterpart of the American DARPA. The organization was reportedly established and led by Mohsen Fakhrizadeh until his assassination outside Tehran on November 26, 2020.

According to the Israeli officials, later backed up by American intelligence officials, it was tasked with the research and development of nuclear weapons, and took over some of the activities of the AMAD Project. It has been sanctioned by the United States Department of State and United States Department of the Treasury. According to the US, it was established in 2011.

Amid the COVID-19 pandemic in Iran, the organization developed Iran's first COVID-19 testing kits and also FAKHRAVAC, a COVID-19 vaccine.

References 

Organisations based in Iran
Government-owned companies of Iran
Government agencies of Iran
Scientific organisations based in Iran